The European Championships is a multi-sport tournament which brings together the existing European Championships of some of the continent's leading sports every four years. The inaugural edition in 2018 was staged by the host cities of Berlin, Germany and Glasgow, Scotland, United Kingdom between 2 and 12 August. The second edition in 2022 took place in Munich, Germany. The various Europe-wide championships in the same disciplines that are held outside this quadrennial framework (annually in the cases of cycling, gymnastics, rowing and triathlon; biennially in the cases of athletics and aquatics) are unaffected by this event.

Overview
European Championships Management, co-founded by Paul Bristow and Marc Joerg, developed the event concept, and manages and implements the European Championships on behalf of the participating Federations.
The 2018 European Athletics Championships were held in Berlin, while Glasgow hosted the Aquatics, Cycling, Gymnastics, Rowing and Triathlon along with a new European Golf Team Championships.

The championships were being staged under one new brand with the 'Mark of a Champion', a star-like logo.

The European Broadcasting Union is a key partner in the event,  broadcasting across Europe's free to air channels via its Eurovision Network, with an estimated audience of 1.03 billion. It is also being broadcast across radio and multiple digital platforms.

This competition is not related to the European Games organised by the European Olympic Committees.

First edition (2018)

The European governing bodies for athletics, aquatics, cycling, golf, gymnastics, rowing and triathlon, co-ordinated their individual continental championships as part of the first edition between 2 and 12 August 2018, hosted by the cities of Berlin (already chosen as the host for the 2018 European Athletics Championships) and Glasgow (already chosen as the host for the 2018 European Aquatics Championships, and which now also hosted the events of the other sports).

The initial participating continental governing bodies, and championships, are:

 European Athletics organising the 2018 European Athletics Championships in Berlin, Germany
 Ligue Européenne de Natation organising the 2018 European Aquatics Championships,
 Union Européenne de Cyclisme organising the 2018 European Cycling Championships, bringing together the individual Track, Road, Mountain Biking and BMX championships of the continent,
 FISA organising the 2018 European Rowing Championships,
 European Triathlon Union organising the European Triathlon Championships, and
 European Union of Gymnastics organising the 2018 European Artistic Gymnastics Championships, all in Glasgow, Scotland
 European Tour and Ladies European Tour organising the inaugural European Golf Team Championships, in Gleneagles, Scotland.

The European Broadcasting Union (EBU), the umbrella body for the continent’s free-to-air channels, was the broadcast partner for the combined championships, which were expected to generate more than 2700 hours of programming. Athletics alone, expects a 20% rise in television viewing figures compared to a traditional single-sport European Athletics Championships.

All of Europe’s major free-to-air broadcasters will televise the European Championships in 2018. The European Broadcasting Union, which holds the broadcast rights on all platforms, has confirmed coverage across the top five markets, BBC in the United Kingdom, ARD/ZDF in Germany, France Televisions in France, RAI in Italy and TVE in Spain. Other EBU members already signed up include VRT (Belgium), HRT (Croatia), DR (Denmark), YLE (Finland), RTÉ (Ireland), NOS (Netherlands), NRK (Norway), TVP (Poland), SRG SSR (Switzerland) and SVT/TV4 (Sweden). The level of coverage is also enhanced by a deal with Eurosport. In total, over 40 EBU members have signed agreements as of April 2018. Discussions are ongoing with broadcasters in the remaining territories in Europe, plus other global territories like China, Japan and USA.

Glasgow 2018 has five Official Partners (People Make Glasgow, Scottish Government, Strathmore Water, Spar & Eurovision) and Berlin 2018 has six Official Partners (Spar, Le Gruyère, Nike, Toyo Tires, Generali & Eurovision) with another tier of Official Supporters across the two host cities. Overall over 56 companies have been signed up to support the inaugural event.

To be staged between 2 and 12 August 2018, around 1,500 athletes will compete at the European Athletics Championships in Berlin, whilst at the same time more than 3,000 will take part in the other championships in Glasgow. Each European Championship will be organised by their respective federation and host city.

On 1 August 2018, at the Opening Party in Glasgow, a new European Championship Trophy was unveiled, to be awarded to the nation achieving the most gold medals across all seven sports during the Championships. It was presented by Katherine Grainger, Emma Fredh and Angelina Melnikova on behalf of the seven European federations involved in the event.

Second edition (2022)

The second edition of the European Championships takes place in Munich, Germany, in the summer of 2022.

Bidding for 2022
The first step in the bidding process for 2022 was the distribution of the official Bid Information Document to interested parties, with a preliminary questionnaire to be submitted. The participating European Sports Federations were expected to announce the 2022 hosts after the first edition in August 2018.

Possible bids included (as host dates had to be 11–21 August to avoid conflicting with the 2022 Commonwealth Games in Birmingham, England):

Athens in Greece - Subject to a joint bid with the local city Elefsina
Brussels, Antwerp, Hazewinkel in Belgium, and Eindhoven in The Netherlands, maybe gymnastics in Luxembourg to form a "Benelux" bid
Hamburg, Germany (Athletics in London, United Kingdom)
London, United Kingdom (to avoid two short-gap European athletics championships in Germany if other sports were hosted there)
Katowice, Poznan and Pruszków, Poland
Rome, Italy (rowing and track cycling in Lombardy region)
North Rhine-Westphalia, Germany (Athletics in London, United Kingdom)
Berlin, Germany (Athletics in London, United Kingdom)
Munich, Germany
Gothenburg and Malmö, Sweden (track cycling and rowing in Copenhagen, Denmark)

In November 2019, Munich was announced as the 2022 host.

Participants
The participating continental governing bodies, and championships, in the 2022 edition of the event, all in Munich, are:

 European Athletics organising the 2022 European Athletics Championships,
 UEC organising the 2022 European Cycling Championships, bringing together the individual Track, Road, Mountain Biking and BMX championships of the continent,
 FISA organising the 2022 European Rowing Championships,
 ETU organising the 2022 European Triathlon Championships, and
 UEG organising the 2022 European Artistic Gymnastics Championships Scotland
 CEV organising the 2022 European Beach Volleyball Championship, ◎
 ICF organising the 2022 European Canoe Sprint Championships, incorporating the 2022 European Paracanoe Sprint Championships, the first para events to be included in the Championships,◎
 IFSC organising the 2022 IFSC Climbing European Championships ◎, and
 ETTU, organising the 2022 European Table Tennis Championships. ◎

◎ : inaugural appearance of the sport at the European Championships.

the European Tour golf organisation, which discontinued the European Team Golf Championships, and LEN/European Aquatics League, which are holding their 2022 European Aquatics Championships simultaneously but separately in Rome, do not return from 2018.

History 
European Athletics, Ligue Européenne de Natation, Union Européenne de Cyclisme, FISA and the European Triathlon Union agreed in 2015 to organise their individual championships as part of the European Championships. The individual federations and the host cities will organise the individual championships with a co-ordinated timetable and a unifying common brand. The championships that will be included are the European Athletics Championships, the European Aquatics Championships, the European Road Championships, the European Track Championships, the European Rowing Championships, and the European Triathlon Championships as well as the European Gymnastics Championships and the new European Golf Team Championships. Both gymnastics and golf formally joined the new event on 23 October 2015.

In the lead up to the announcement of the programme for the second edition of the combined European Championships, both the European Tour and LEN announced that their respective sports would not be part of the event; the European Team Golf Championship was suspended after one edition, while the 2022 European Aquatics Championships was moved to Rome, Italy. On June 18, 2020, Munich 2022 announced the final sports programme of nine sports: Athletics, Cycling, Gymnastics, Rowing, Triathlon returned, while the four new sports of Beach Volleyball, Canoe Sprint, Sports Climbing and Table Tennis were added. The European Aquatics Championships will, however, be held over the same dates as the combined championships.

Host cities

European Championships Trophy 

The European Championships Trophy, one of the unifying elements of the multi-sport event, is awarded to the nation that finishes top of the overall medal table featuring all participating sports.

Medal table
Medal Table after 2022 European Championship 

Notes
 Not included in the official medal table.

See also 
 European Championship

References

External links
 
 

 

European international sports competitions
Multi-sport events in Europe